Celtic Colours International Festival is a Celtic music festival held annually in October in communities on Cape Breton Island in Nova Scotia, Canada. First held in 1997, the festival has featured musicians from the Celtic world and attracted visitors to Cape Breton Island around the time of peak autumn colour. The Festival presents dozens of concerts on the island, an extensive line-up of workshops, a visual art series of exhibitions, and a nightly Festival Club. Artists have traveled from Scotland, Ireland, Wales, England, Brittany, Spain, Denmark, Germany, Norway, Cuba, and Sweden, as well as from across the United States and Canada.

Locations
Concert venues are in cities all across Cape Breton Island, including Sydney, the Fortress of Louisbourg National Historic Site, the Savoy Theater is Glace Bay, and the Strathspey Performing Arts Centre in Mabou. Other venues vary from fire halls, schools, community centers, and parishes.

Features and events
The Festival has a schedule with as many as six concerts each day.

Workshops, offered in many aspects of Celtic and Gaelic culture, allow visitors and residents alike to get the hands-on experience they desire. Host communities around the island present workshops in Gaelic language and song, components of tradition, instrument instruction and traditional dance, as well as offering cultural tours, cèilidhs, and a lecture series. They also organize an extensive array of community events including meals and dances.

The Festival Club is a popular draw of the festival. Located at the Gaelic College in St. Ann's, the Festival Club opens as the evening concerts are closing, offering an opportunity for Festival artists to perform in a more informal setting, or to get a session in with friends and colleagues from near and far. Performance is by invitation only and depends upon artist availability on any given night.

References

External links 
Celtic Colours Website

Folk festivals in Canada
Music festivals in Nova Scotia
Celtic music
Recurring events established in 1997
Celtic music festivals